Harworth Colliery Ladies Football Club is an English women's football club based in Bircotes, Nottinghamshire. The club currently play in the Sheffield & Hallamshire Women's League division one.

History

Season by season record

References

Women's football clubs in England
Sheffield & Hallamshire County FA members